Cornelius Thomas Finnegan Jr. (December 13, 1918 – September 29, 2006) was an American lawyer and politician who served in the Massachusetts House of Representatives.

References

1918 births
2006 deaths
Democratic Party members of the Massachusetts House of Representatives
20th-century American politicians
United States Marine Corps personnel of World War II
United States Marine Corps non-commissioned officers